The Laslău Mare gas field is a natural gas field in Laslău Mare, Suplac Commune, Mureș County.

Background
It was discovered in 1920 and developed by Romgaz since 1975. In year 2003 a rehabilitation agreement was set between Romgaz and Schlumberger to increase production.   It began producing in 1975 and produces natural gas and small amounts of Natural gas condensate. The total proven reserves of the Laslău Mare gas field are around 176 billion cubic feet (5 km³), and production is slated to be around 21.3 million cubic feet/day (0.6×105m³) in 2008 after retechnologisation works performed by Schlumberger.

References

Natural gas fields in Romania